Black Hills National Cemetery is a United States National Cemetery in South Dakota, located three miles (5 km) southeast of Sturgis in Meade County. It encompasses , and as 2021, had over 30,000 interments. Located at exit 34 of Interstate 90, it is administered by the U.S. Department of Veterans Affairs, which also administers the nearby Fort Meade National Cemetery. It is one of three national cemeteries in South Dakota (the other two being Fort Meade and Hot Springs).

History 
The area around the Black Hills Cemetery was originally inhabited by the Lakota Indians.  French explorers went through the region in the 1740s, and Spain laid claim to the area in 1762 until it was acquired by the United States in the Louisiana Purchase of 1803.  Fort Randall was established in 1856, and the 1861 establishment of Dakota Territory brought more settlers to the region, but it wasn't until gold was discovered in the Black Hills that the area acquired a large white settler population.  Under the Treaty of Fort Laramie, the Lakota retained possession of the land of the Black Hills, but there was no stopping the settlers from entering the region, which led to several conflicts.  Most of the original interments in the cemetery were soldiers who fell in battles of the Indian Wars, but it has since been used to inter veterans from every major campaign the United States has been involved in.  The cemetery was listed on the National Register of Historic Places in 2016.

Expansion
In 2018, Kristi Noem sponsored the Black Hills Cemetery Act in Congress that approved of an expansion of the Black Hills cemetery.

Notable interments 
 Medal of Honor recipient
 U.S. Sergeant Charles Windolph, Medal of Honor recipient for action at the Battle of Little Bighorn during the Indian Wars
 Others
 U.S. Army veteran, Lakota actor and stuntman Dave Bald Eagle
 U.S. Senator Francis Higbee Case, World War I veteran, U.S. Representative for the 75th–81st congresses, United States Senate from 1951 until his death in 1962
 U.S. Brigadier General Richard E. Ellsworth
 U.S. Representative and South Dakota Governor William J. Janklow
 U.S. Lieutenant Commander John Charles Waldron, Distinguished Flying Cross

See also
 National Register of Historic Places listings in Meade County, South Dakota

References

External links 
 National Cemetery Administration
 Black Hills National Cemetery
 
 
 

Cemeteries in South Dakota
Protected areas of Meade County, South Dakota
United States national cemeteries
Historic American Landscapes Survey in South Dakota
Sturgis, South Dakota
Black Hills
Cemeteries on the National Register of Historic Places in South Dakota
National Register of Historic Places in Meade County, South Dakota
1948 establishments in South Dakota